The 55th Mountain Motor Rifle Brigade (Russian:55-я отдельная мотострелковая бригада) (Military Unit Number 55115) is a mechanized infantry brigade of the Russian Ground Forces. It is located in Kyzyl, Tyva Republic, as part of the 41st Combined Arms Army of the Central Military District.

In April 2014, it was reported that a new mountain motor rifle brigade would be formed in Kyzyl, Tyva Republic, in 2015. In July 2014 Krasnaya Zvezda wrote that the organizational core of the future brigade had already arrived in Tuva. Colonel Andrei Shelukhin, head of the organizing group, and many of his subordinates arrived in Tuva from mountainous Tajikistan "so they had experience in conquering peaks." On June 28, 2014, a Snow Leopard mountaineering club team, together with officers of the mountain brigade Kydykbek Sheripov and Alexander Umrikhin, climbed the highest peak of Tuva and all of Eastern Siberia - Mount Mongun-Taiga (Silver Taiga), "and now their pennants are flying at the height of 3,976 meters." The head of government in Tuva, Sholban Kara-ool, reportedly ordered that each of the future mountain rifle candidates also had a recommendation signed by the relevant district official. The article also said that high-ranking officials made no attempts to avoid military service for their sons.

The brigade was formed in November 2015. 1047 of the 1300 servicemen were found from the natives of Tuva.

In November 2018, an Unmanned aerial vehicle unit was formed as part of the brigade, equipped with Orlan-10 and Eleron-3 drones.

It has been involved in the 2022 Russian invasion of Ukraine.

Russian-Ukrainian war 
Main articles: Russo-Ukrainian War and 2022 Russian invasion of Ukraine

On March 3, 2022 the troops of the 55th brigade entered the village of Yagodnoye near Chernihiv. The troops stopped in the village and set up their headquarters in the local school. According to local residents, the military herded people into the basement of the school under threat of death. Within a week, the number of captives in the basement, which consisted of a gym and four or five small rooms, grew from a few dozen to more than 300. Among them was a 6-week-old baby, dozens of other children, and several elderly people, the oldest of whom was 93 of the year. “It was very hot in the basement. There was nothing to breathe. Elderly people began to die because there was not enough food, air, medicine,” says a villager. Houses were destroyed, stolen, sometimes mined. Many of the soldiers suspected of participating in the Yagodnoe outrage, including nine accused of war crimes, come from the Siberian region of Tuva, one of the poorest in Russia. “In the village of Yagodnoye, Chernihiv region, 360 residents, including 74 children and five disabled people, were forced by the Russian armed forces to stay for 28 days in the basement of a school they used as their base,” said the UN High Commissioner for Human Rights. “The basement was extremely crowded. People had to sit all day without being able to lie down. There was no toilet, no water, no ventilation. Ten elderly people have died."

References 

Mechanised infantry brigades of Russia
Military units and formations established in 2016